The Household Troops Band (HTB) is a brass band of the Salvation Army made up of Salvationist musicians from all around the UK. The band regularly performs at different Salvation Army corps and venues around the UK, as well as undertaking yearly recording projects. Over the years the band has toured internationally to many countries around the world. The Household Troops band is seen as one of the UK's premier Salvation Army Bands, alongside the International Staff Band. The Household Troops is unique in the Salvation Army as it is the only Salvation Army band internationally that wears a distinctive Pith Helmet.

History

In the early Summer of 1885, there was a "Great Kent March" by Salvation Army Officer Cadets.  They were known as "Life Guards" and the march was headed by a band of 25 brass instrumentalists, each wearing a white pith military helmet (the normal military headgear of the day), a red guernsey, blue trousers and gaiters and carrying a knapsack and water bottle.  Later it was suggested that a permanent band might be established.  A War Cry (Salvation Army newspaper) advert called for volunteers; it read:

If you're young, if you're saved, if you're physically fit, if you can play a brass instrument.....are prepared to leave home and family for six months active service for God and the Army...then be at Clapton Congress Hall on 12 March 1887.

The Household Troops Band was formed with Staff-Captain Harry Appleby as bandmaster.  No salary was offered and no guarantee was given apart from food and clothing.  On 1 June 1887 the pioneer 25 members of the Household Troops Band left Clapton Congress Hall to march into Salvation Army history. Their first tour lasted six months. The next year, in October, the band left for Canada as the first British Salvation Army band to cross the Atlantic.  The tour was a tremendous success and led to Canada's own Household Troops Band being formed.

Whilst they were away a second group of players was inaugurated under the leadership of Samuel Webber and the tradition continued. On 14 October 1889, in the country village of Whitchurch in Hampshire, it is reported that the Household Troops Band lead a march of over 1000 Salvationists in a great march for liberty.  The local Salvationists had suffered persecution and injury in the Whitchurch Riots and over 800 had been imprisoned for conducting open-air services.  As a result of this demonstration and others led by the local Corps, The Salvation Army won a landmark legal case and with it, the right to play and preach in the open-air.

The first Troops band returned home to Britain in 1891 and later members of both bands amalgamated.  Then six years after it all started, in 1893, the band was dissolved to make way for a new band, and it was from the ashes of the Household Troops Band that the International Headquarters Staff Band (now known as the International Staff Band) was formed.

The Troops Today

Over a century later, in 1985, the then National Bandmaster, Captain John Mott, formed a new Household Troops Band with members drawn from the "A" Band at the National School of Music, at Cobham Hall. Major John Mott officially retired as Troops Bandmaster on 16 October 2010 and was replaced by Carl Saunders.

The band is drawn from many different Salvation Army centres. The members are selected for their Salvationism, stamina, flexibility and their musical skills.

The band hold just a few rehearsals in preparation for the Summer Tour which is the backbone of the work undertaken. Hence the need for a high degree of skill. The tours, which usually take place during the last week of August, are conducted mainly in coastal resorts where the holiday crowds are largest and the local Corps resources are sometimes stretched because of the holidays.

One of the features of the band is that they march to the afternoon open-air venue. This is sometimes difficult because of traffic, but with good organisation and the co-operation of the local police, is usually achieved.  Then, in the evening, a Festival is held in the local Citadel.

The band's tours to date have been: 1985 South Coast; 1991 Bournemouth area; 1996 East Coast; 1997 Essex, Kent & Dorset; 1998 Devon & Cornwall; 1999 Major Cities of England & Wales; 2000 the South Coast of England; 2001 Scotland; 2002 USA & Canada; 2003 Eastbourne and the South Coast of England; 2004 East Midlands; 2006 West Country; 2007 Singapore & Australia; 2008 Scotland; 2009 Bristol & South Coast; 2010 Norway; 2011 Southern California

The band also produces a CD recording most years.

See also

Maidenhead Citadel Band
Salvation Army Band
The Salvation Army
International Staff Band
Chalk Farm Salvation Army Band
Brass Band
Melbourne Staff Band

References

External links
Household Troops Band

Salvation Army brass bands
British brass bands
Salvationism in England